The Trillion dollar club is an unofficial classification of the world's major economies with a gross domestic product (nominal GDP) of more than US$1 trillion per year.  As of 2017, it  included 16 countries. This does not include purchasing power parity, which increases the GDP of many countries with an undervalued currency, which are usually poorer countries.

All of the G8 and BRIC countries are currently $1 trillion economies in United States dollars. Since currency valuations can be subject to rapid change, a country could achieve the US$1 trillion nominal GDP mark one year and then produce less than that in total goods and services the following year(s). The 2010 data used here are compiled according to the International Monetary Fund (IMF) values. As for the former Soviet Union, the last statistics about its economy stated that it had an over US$2.5 trillion economy in the 1990 fiscal year, before its collapse. Also, the Soviet Union reached US$1 trillion in 1978.

US$1 trillion – US$10 trillion

US$1 trillion economy

US$2 trillion economy

US$3 trillion economy

US$4 trillion economy

US$5 trillion economy

US$6 trillion economy

US$7 trillion economy

US$8 trillion economy

US$9 trillion economy

US$10 trillion economy

US$11 trillion – US$20 trillion

US$11 trillion economy

US$12 trillion economy

US$13 trillion economy

US$14 trillion economy

US$15 trillion economy

US$16 trillion economy

US$17 trillion economy

US$18 trillion economy

US$19 trillion economy

US$20 trillion economy

US$21 trillion – US$30 trillion

US$21 trillion economy

US$22 trillion economy

See also
 List of countries by GDP (nominal)
 List of countries by GDP (PPP)

References

Country classifications
Economic development
Economic history
Gross domestic product
Economic country classifications
International relations
Investment
Lists of countries by economic indicator